Treachery in Death by Nora Roberts writing as J.D. Robb is the thirty-second book in the In Death series. The plot is set in the future and follows Lieutenant Eve Dallas of the New York Police and Security Department (NYPSD) and her team as they work to take down a corrupt cop.

References

In Death (novel series)
2011 American novels
G. P. Putnam's Sons books